Old Town Elementary School or variants thereof may refer to:

 Old Town Elementary School (Old Town, Florida)
Old Town Elementary School (Round Rock, Texas)